Dănuț Dobre (born 20 February 1967) is a retired Romanian rower. Competing in different events he won four silver medals at two Olympics and two world championships between 1987 and 1992. After retiring from competitions in 1993, he worked in personal security, guarding Nicolae Văcăroiu, Ion Iliescu and Emil Constantinescu, among others.

References

External links 
 
 
 

1967 births
Living people
Romanian male rowers
Rowers at the 1988 Summer Olympics
Rowers at the 1992 Summer Olympics
Olympic rowers of Romania
Olympic medalists in rowing
People from Fetești
Medalists at the 1992 Summer Olympics
Medalists at the 1988 Summer Olympics
Olympic silver medalists for Romania
World Rowing Championships medalists for Romania